MTV Roadies Rising is the fourteenth season of Indian reality show MTV Roadies. The show is hosted by Gaelyn Mendonca. It started airing on MTV India from 25 February 2017. Audition episodes were aired from 25 February 2017. The audition was done by the four aspiring gang leaders - Rannvijay Singha, Karan Kundrra, Neha Dhupia and Prince Narula and cricketer Harbhajan Singh is to play a crucial part. Later Nikhil Chinapa replaced Karan Kundrra as gang leader on the journey. Journey started on 8 April 2017 and Roadies Battleground was on 7 April 2017.

Destination 

India – Auditions and Roadies Journey [Episode 1 – 26] Finale

Finalist
Gang Neha
Shweta Mehta -   Winner
Gang Prince 
Baseer Ali  -   Runner-up

Gang

Vote Out Order

Voting history

 Rannvijay Gang
 Prince Gang
 Neha Gang
 Nikhil Gang

 Indicates the contestant was immune that week.
 Indicates the contestant was in the danger that week.
 Indicates the contestant was eliminated that week.
 The contestant quit the competition
 Indicates the contestant wild card entry in the competition.
 Indicates the contestant won the task and was save from elimination.
 Indicates the contestant was eliminated outside vote out that week.
 Indicates the contestant is the runner up.
 Indicates the contestant won the competition.

 Note
 -Ruling gang Ranvijay received a special power where they can cast their votes after the rest of the votes are revealed. They decided to use the power. 
 -Ruling gang Ranvijay received two special powers. One includes the gang leader can cancel two votes. With Ranviajy choosing Baseer and Varun, their votes are not counted. The second power includes casting their vote after the rest of the votes are revealed. 
 -An internal gang nomination put Chiranjeevi, Divya and Shane in the danger zone. Ruling gang Ranvijay cast the final votes in order to vote-out one of the nominated roadies. 
 -Ruling gang Ranvijay received a special power which allowed two of their gang members to put two votes. He chose Samar and Shiv to cast double votes.

References

MTV Roadies
2017 Indian television seasons